Queen Gyeonghwa of the Incheon Yi clan (Hangul: 경화왕후 이씨, Hanja: 敬和王后 李氏; 1079–1109) was a Goryeo princess as the only daughter of King Seonjong and Consort Jeongsin who became a queen consort through her marriage with her first cousin, King Yejong as his first and primary wife, which she became the 11th reigned Goryeo queen who followed her maternal clan after Queen Inpyeong. She was called before as Princess Yeonhwa when still a child/princess.

She then followed her mother's clan, the Incheon Yi and married in 1106, along with she whom formally became Yejong's queen. Beside their relationship before as a first cousin, Yejong was said to love her very much due to her appearance and attitude were clear and extraordinary beautiful. However, she later died on her 31 years old in 1109 and Yejong was said to be very sad about this, then buried her in Jareung Tomb (자릉, 慈陵) and gave her Posthumous name.

References

External links
Queen Gyeonghwa on Encykorea .

1079 births
1109 deaths
Royal consorts of the Goryeo Dynasty
Korean queens consort
Goryeo princesses
11th-century Korean women
12th-century Korean women